The 2000 LSU Tigers football team represented Louisiana State University in the 2000 NCAA Division I-A football season.  Coached by Nick Saban in his first year at LSU, the Tigers played their home games at Tiger Stadium in Baton Rouge, Louisiana.  Saban led the team to a turnaround from a 3–8 record in 1999 to an 8–4 record and a victory in the Peach Bowl.

Schedule

Season summary

Western Carolina

Roster and Coaches

Rankings

LSU Tigers in the 2001 National Football League Draft

References

LSU
LSU Tigers football seasons
Peach Bowl champion seasons
LSU Tigers football